Pagodatrochus variabilis is a species of sea snail, a marine gastropod mollusk in the family Trochidae.

Description
The size of the shell varies between 3 mm and 7 mm.

Distribution
This species occurs in the Red Sea and in the western Indian Ocean.

References

External links
 To World Register of Marine Species
 

variabilis
Gastropods described in 1873